Tapan Singhel born 12 August 1966 in Varanasi has been the Managing Director (MD) and Chief Executive Officer (CEO) of Bajaj Allianz General Insurance since April 2012.

Career 
Tapan started his career with New India Assurance Company Limited as a direct officer in 1991. He has handled portfolios as varied as accounts, IT, underwriting, claims, marketing, sales, etc. throughout his career.

He has recently taken over as Chairman of the Confederation of Indian Industry (CII) National Committee on Insurance & Pensions 2020-21.He was also the president of the Indo-German Chamber of Commerce and was earlier the vice-president (VP) for the year 2013-14. He was a member of the board of directors for Berkshire India Limited and Berkshire Hathway Services India Private Limited during 2011-12.

Before becoming the MD and CEO, Tapan was the chief marketing officer at Bajaj Allianz General Insurance, heading all retail channels and territories. He has been with Bajaj Allianz since its inception in 2001. Tapan was also involved in various international projects such as setting up a retail business for Allianz in China. He works in Pune.

Under his leadership, the Company has won many awards including Non-Life Insurer of the Year  at the Outlook Money Conclave 2020, as well as General Insurance Company of the Year and Customer Service Provider of the Year at the 4th Annual Insurance India Summit & Awards 2019.

In 2019,  Tapan spoke with HBR Ascend about how he pivoted from science to insurance, how he derived happiness at work when he was young, and how his idea of happiness at work has evolved over the years. Here are some excerpts of his interview on HBR Ascend.

Tapan Singhel has a rich experience in the insurance industry of more than 30 years. He has been with Bajaj Allianz General Insurance for over 20 years and is the Company’s MD & CEO for close to 10 years. He also chairs the CII National Committee on Insurance and Pensions. Under his leadership, the company has emerged as the most profitable private general insurer in the country ensuring growth, profitability and customer-centricity. Since he took over, the Company has achieved a cumulative underwriting profit of ₹ 554 crore, grew its revenues (GWP) at a CAGR of 15.1% and profits (PAT) at a CAGR of 20.7%.
Customer obsession and passion to do good for the people are what drives Tapan and his success in the industry. A scientist by education, but insurer at heart he works towards making a difference in the

His leadership has been recognized across the globe. He was honored as the 'Personality of the Year' at Quantic’s BFSI Excellence Awards 2021, India Insurance Summit & Awards 2019, 22nd Asia Insurance Industry Awards 2018 and Indian Insurance Summit 2017. He was also awarded the title of Best CEO at Insurance Asia Awards. By always imbibing the principle of empathy towards customers and employees, he has been instrumental in the organization being recognized on various forums. To name a few, Best Digital Insurer in Asia for IDC Financial Insights Innovation Awards 2021, Non-Life Insurer Provider of the Year by Outlook Money Awards 2020, Best Motor Insurance Provider of the Year at the prestigious Business Today-Money Today Financial Services Awards 2021. The Company has also won the coveted Porter Prize award under the category of Creating Distinct Value in 2019. Tapan is known for his ‘Communicative Leadership’ style, where he believes in engaging regularly with employees and customers through social media.

Tapan also has his own podcast, where he shares his insights on a wide range of topics, from insurance to entrepreneurship and a lot more.

Education 
Tapan's basic education was at La Martiniere for Boys in Kolkata and St. Peters, Agra. As a man of science, he has an M.Sc. Degree in Physics with a specialization in Lasers & Spectroscopy from Banaras Hindu University.

Awards and recognition 

CEO of the Year at 5th Annual Insurance India Summit & Awards 2020
Appointed Chairman of the CII's National Committee on Insurance & Pensions 20-21
LinkedIn Top Voice in 2019 
Personality of the Year at the 22nd Asia Insurance Industry Awards 2019 
LinkedIn Top Voice in 2018  
LinkedIn Power Profile in 2018 
CEO of the Year at Indian Insurance Summit & Awards 2018 
LinkedIn Power Profile in 2017 
The Most Promising Business Leaders of Asia 2017 by the Economic Times 
CEO of the year 2017 by Insurance Asia.
LinkedIn Power Profile in 2016 
CEO of the year 2016 by Insurance Asia.
 India's most trusted CEO 2017 by WCRC Leaders Asia 
India's most trusted CEO 2018 by WCRC Leaders Asia 
 Best admired leader 2016 by White Page International.
 ASSOCHAM Leadership Award - CEO 2016 
 CEO with Human Resource Orientation award at the Asia-Pacific HRM Congress 2015 
 Great People Leader Award 2014 by Allianz SE
IPE BFSI Leader Award 2013 
CEO of the year at IDC Future Enterprise Awards India 
CEO of the year Award - 2021 Asia-Pacific at IDC Future Enterprise Awards India

References

Businesspeople from Varanasi
Indian chief executives
1966 births
Living people
Banaras Hindu University alumni